Akercocke are an English extreme metal band from London, formed in 1997 by Jason Mendonça and David Gray. The band also features Paul Scanlan and Nathanael Underwood.

History
Akercocke's first album, Rape of the Bastard Nazarene, was self-released by the band in 1999. Akercocke later signed to Peaceville Records, releasing The Goat of Mendes in 2001, which reached number 4 in Terrorizer's album of the year chart. In 2003 the album Choronzon was released, through Earache Records. This album was voted number 1 metal release of the year by Terrorizer. Paul Scanlan left the band after this album, and was replaced by Matt Wilcock.

Words That Go Unspoken, Deeds That Go Undone was released in October 2005. On 18 January 2007, Peter Theobalds left the band, and was replaced by Peter Benjamin.

Akercocke released their fifth album, Antichrist, in May 2007. Whilst touring to promote the album, due to the anti-Christian nature of the music, the band generated controversy in Northern Ireland when they scheduled a tour date in Belfast on 18 May 2007, and appeared on BBC1's debate show Nolan Live on 16 May 2007 to defend their right to play there. The band broke up in 2012 following extensive periods of inactivity. Prior to the break up, Akercocke were planning to release a DVD based on their 10-year anniversary as a band, though this was never released.

Akercocke revealed a surprise reunion as a band in 2016, featuring original lead guitarist Paul Scanlan returning to the band along with newcomer Nathanael Underwood on bass. The band posted a brand new song on YouTube, titled "Inner Sanctum" on 18 June 2017. The launch of a new official website on 25 April 2016 was followed on 26 April 2016 with the announcement of a series of reunion shows starting with Bloodstock Open Air 2016 and a full UK tour. A new album, Renaissance in Extremis, was released on 25 August 2017, which was their first full-length album in a decade since 2007's Antichrist. In May 2021, the band announced they had begun recording a new album.

Members
Current
 Jason Mendonça – vocals, rhythm guitar (1997–2012, 2016–present)
 David Gray – drums (1997–2012, 2016–present)
 Paul Scanlan – lead guitar (1997–2003, 2016–present)
 Sam Loynes – keyboards (2010–2012, 2016–present)
 Federico Benini – bass (2019–present)

Former
 Martin Bonsoir – keyboards (1997–2003)
 Daniel "The Ritz" Reeves – keyboards (2004–2006)
 Matt Wilcock – guitar (2004–2010)
 Peter Theobalds – bass (1997–2006)
 Peter Benjamin – bass (2006–2012)
 Rob Archibald – keyboards (2006–2010)
 Dan Knight – guitar (2010–2012)
 Nathanael Underwood – bass (2016–2018)

Timeline

Discography
Studio albums
 Rape of the Bastard Nazarene (1999)
 The Goat of Mendes (2001)
 Choronzon (2003)
 Words That Go Unspoken, Deeds That Go Undone (2005)
 Antichrist (2007)
 Renaissance in Extremis (2017)

References

1997 establishments in England
Articles which contain graphical timelines
Blackened death metal musical groups
Earache Records artists
English black metal musical groups
English death metal musical groups
English progressive metal musical groups
Musical groups established in 1997
Musical groups from London
Musical quintets